Evangelos Natsis Georgiou also known as Strempeniotis or Kapetan Vangelis, was a Slavophone Greek soldier and revolutionary who participated in the Greco-Turkish War of 1897 and the Macedonian Struggle.

Early life 
Evangelos Georgiou was born about 1876 in Srebreno, Salonika Vilayet, Ottoman Empire (now Asprogeia, Florina regional unit). It is said that his held distant roots from Epirus. He moved to Constantinople in his youth where he worked as a milkman and a mason.

Armed Action 
In 1897, he volunteered for military service in the Greco-Turkish War of 1897 where he would take part in the Battle of Velestino. He joined the Bulgarian IMRO, However, he would defect to the Greek side following his dissatisfaction with their treatment of the Greek population and an attempt on his life by a Komitadji. He would participate in the Ilinden Uprising of 1903 independent from the IMRO. In 1904, as a Makedonomachos, he would form one of the first organized armed groups with external Greek support in the Macedonian Struggle. He co-operated with Germanos Karavangelis, who brought him in contact with volunteers who had just arrived from Crete. He organized his own troop and inflicted many losses on the IMRO, most importantly the extermination of the Voivode Kirchev.

On 12 May 1904, returning from Monastir, he was killed in an ambush at Aetos, by the cheta of Aleksandar Turundzhev.

Legacy 
He was survived by his daughter.

A bust of him was erected in Kastoria in 1960.

There is a statue of him in his birthplace of Asprogeia.

Reference and notes

1870s births
1904 deaths
People from Salonica vilayet
Slavic speakers of Greek Macedonia
Eastern Orthodox Christians from Greece
19th-century Greek people
Macedonian revolutionaries (Greek)
People of the Macedonian Struggle
Greeks from the Ottoman Empire
People from Florina (regional unit)